Vasily Sorokin (born 1927) is a Soviet former sports shooter. He competed in the 25 metre pistol event at the 1956 Summer Olympics.

References

1927 births
Living people
Soviet male sport shooters
Olympic shooters of the Soviet Union
Shooters at the 1956 Summer Olympics
Place of birth missing (living people)